Ichneutica sericata is a moth of the family Noctuidae. It is endemic to New Zealand. This species is variable and difficult to distinguish from I. skelloni specimens. It is known from the southern part of the South Island and from Stewart Island. There has been one specimen collected in Taranaki but although Robert Hoare determined the species, he expressed reservations given the location of collection. I. sercata inhabits shrubland at altitudes of between 470 and 900m. The life history of this species is unknown as are the host species of its larvae. The adults of this species are on the wing in August at Stewart Island and in November and December in the South Island.

Taxonomy 
This species was first described by George Howes in 1945 from specimens taken near the Homer tunnel.  The lectotype specimen is held at the  Museum of New Zealand Te Papa Tongarewa. In 1988 J. S. Dugdale placed this species within the Graphania genus. In 2019 Robert Hoare undertook a major review of New Zealand Noctuidae species. During this review the genus Ichneutica was greatly expanded and the genus Graphania was subsumed into that genus as a synonym. As a result of this review, this species is now known as Ichneutica sericata.

Description 
Howes described this species as follows:
The wingspan of the male is between 34 and 40 mm and the wingspan of the female is between 37 and 39 mm. This species is variable and difficult to distinguish from I. skelloni specimens. However the male I. sericata has longer pectinations on its antennae. Paler forms of this species have forewings that are mostly the same reddish brown colour. The hindwing has a discal spot that is distinctive. The darker forms of this species, found in Fiordland and Stewart Island, have a less distinct discal spot.

Distribution 
It is endemic to New Zealand. This species is known from the southern part of the South Island as well as Table Hill at Stewart Island. There is one specimen collected in the Pouakai Range, Taranaki in the North Island. Having examined the specimen, Hoare identified it as I. sericata but had reservations given the location of its collection.

Habitat 
This species has been collected in shrubland at altitudes of between 470 and 900 m.

Behaviour 
Adults of this species are on the wing in August in Stewart Island and between November and December for the South Island.

Life history and host species 
The life history of this species is unknown as are the host species of its larvae.

References

Moths described in 1945
Hadeninae
Moths of New Zealand
Endemic fauna of New Zealand
Taxa named by George Howes (entomologist)
Endemic moths of New Zealand